Cheikh Tidiane N'Doye (born 29 March 1986) is a Senegalese professional footballer who plays as a midfielder for  club Red Star. He made 30 appearances scoring twice for the Senegal national team between 2014 and 2019.

Club career
Born in Rufisque, N'Doye began his career with Yakaar before moving to France to play for Épinal. Following his time there, he had stints at Créteil and Angers.

He was captain of Angers in the 2016–17 season leading them to the Coupe de France final which they lost 1–0 to Paris Saint-Germain.

On 14 July 2017, N'Doye signed a two-year contract with English club Birmingham City, moving on a free transfer. He went straight into the starting eleven for the opening fixture of the 2017–18 season, which Birmingham lost 1–0 away to Ipswich Town, and made 37 league appearances as his team narrowly avoided relegation from the Championship. N'Doye appeared in Birmingham's first two matches of 2018–19, but with the club under pressure to reduce expenditure to comply with Financial Fair Play regulations, he was allowed to return to his former club, Angers, on loan for the season. He was released by Birmingham when his contract expired in June 2019.

On 6 October 2020, after over a year without a club, N'Doye returned to France, signing a one-year deal with Championnat National side Red Star.

International career
N'Doye made his international debut for Senegal in 2014. He was a member of Senegal's 23-man squad for the 2018 World Cup in Russia. In April 2019 he suffered a ruptured anterior cruciate ligament so missed the 2019 Africa Cup of Nations.

Career statistics

Club

International

Scores and results list Senegal's goal tally first, score column indicates score after each Ndoye's goal.

Honours
Créteil
 Championnat National: 2012–13

Angers
 Coupe de France runners-up: 2016–17

References

1986 births
Living people
People from Rufisque
Senegalese footballers
Senegal international footballers
Association football midfielders
ASC Yakaar players
SAS Épinal players
US Créteil-Lusitanos players
Angers SCO players
Birmingham City F.C. players
Red Star F.C. players
Senegal Premier League players
Championnat National 2 players
Championnat National players
Ligue 2 players
Ligue 1 players
English Football League players
2017 Africa Cup of Nations players
2018 FIFA World Cup players
Senegalese expatriate footballers
Senegalese expatriate sportspeople in France
Expatriate footballers in France
Senegalese expatriate sportspeople in England
Expatriate footballers in England